Ercole Graziani the Younger (1688–1765) was an Italian painter of the Baroque period, active mainly in Bologna and Piacenza.

Biography
Ercole was a pupil of the painter Donato Creti and Marcantonio Franceschini. Pope Benedict XIV ordered a copy of his St. Peter consecrating St. Apollinaire (Bologna Cathedral) for the church of Sant'Apollinare in Rome.

He also painted altarpieces depicting respectively St. Simon Stock receives a scapular from the Virgin and St. Pietro Thoma  for the first chapels to left and right of the Church of the Carmine in Medicina.

Among his many pupils are Giuseppe Becchetti, Antonio Concioli and Carlo Bianconi.

References

Graziani biography.

1688 births
1765 deaths
17th-century Italian painters
Italian male painters
18th-century Italian painters
Painters from Bologna
Italian Baroque painters
18th-century Italian male artists